Luísa Alzira Teixeira Soriano (April 29, 1887 – May 28, 1963) was a Brazilian politician who served as the mayor of Lajes, Rio Grande do Norte. In 1928, she became the first female mayor in Brazil and South America, at the age of 32. She was a widow and a mother of three daughters.

References 

1887 births
1963 deaths
20th-century Brazilian women politicians